The 2007 Winmau World Masters was a darts tournament being staged by the British Darts Organisation at Leisure World in Bridlington between 16–18 November 2007. It also featured a qualifying event for the 2008 Lakeside World Professional Championship.

History was made by John Walton who became the first player to hit a perfect nine-dart finish in the televised stage of the tournament. The event was broadcast by the BBC, however the nine-darter was not shown live as it was achieved in the last 16 before their live coverage began.

Michael van Gerwen was unable to defend his title, as he had decided to switch to rival organisation, the Professional Darts Corporation - thereby making himself ineligible under the BDO's rules.

Scotland's Robert Thornton surprised the field by beating Co Stompé, BDO world champion Martin Adams, Martin Atkins and Darryl Fitton to win the title and also seal a qualifying place for the 2008 BDO World Championship.

Controversy
Controversy hit the tournament in May when it was confirmed by the British Darts Organisation that the Winmau World Masters had been moved from its original dates of 26–28 October to a new date of 16–18 November  clashing directly with the Grand Slam of Darts - a new tournament which was hoping to feature the top players from both darting organisations - the BDO and PDC.

This meant that players from the BDO were forced into a direct choice between competing at the Masters for valuable ranking points or taking their place at the Grand Slam for better prize money. BDO World Champion Martin Adams almost immediately confirmed that he would participate in the Masters. The other top BDO players who had qualified, including Gary Anderson, Scott Waites and Mark Webster competed at the Grand Slam and missed the Masters.

Adams plus the next seven highest ranked BDO players who hadn't qualified for the Grand Slam were later given seeding positions through to the BBC televised stages of the tournament for the first time.

2007 Men's Event results
Each set is best of 3 legs.

Highest tournament averages: Robert Thornton 96.41; Darryl Fitton 95.81; Co Stompé 95.25; Martin Adams 94.28

2007 Women's Event results
Semi-finals (best of 7 legs)
Karen Lawman  4-3 Rilana Erades 
Karin Krappen  4-2 Trina Gulliver 

Final (best of 7 legs)
Karin Krappen  4-3 Karen Lawman

2007 Boy's Event results
Semi-finals (best of 7 legs)
Shaun Griffiths  4-1 David Coyne 
Michael Smith  4-2 Oskar Lukasia 

Final (best of 7 legs)
Shaun Griffiths  4-0 Michael Smith

2007 Girl's Event results
Semi-finals (best of 7 legs)
Kimberley Lewis  4-0 Amy Chappell 
Lorraine Hyde  4-1 Linda Odén 

Final (best of 7 legs)
Kimberley Lewis  4-2 Lorraine Hyde

See also
 Winmau World Masters - history of the event

References

World Masters
World Masters (darts)
Bridlington
2000s in the East Riding of Yorkshire